Fork Ridge is a ridge located in the Catskill Mountains of New York south-southwest of Phoenicia. Wittenberg Mountain is located southeast, Terrace Mountain is located east-southeast, and Garfield Mountain is located north of Fork Ridge.

References

Mountains of Ulster County, New York
Mountains of New York (state)